Neli may refer to:

Given name 
Neli A'asa (born 1988), American football player
Neli Boteva  (born 1974), Bulgarian badminton player
Neli Irman (born 1986), Slovenian handball player
Neli Marinova  (born 1971), Bulgarian volleyball player
Neli Lifuka (born 1909), Tuvaluan marine engineer and magistrate on Vaitupu
Neli Kodrič (born 1964), Slovenian children's writer
Neli Zafirova (born 1976), Bulgarian sprint canoer

Other uses 
Coleophora neli, is a moth of the family Coleophoridae
Colophon neli, is a species of beetle in family Lucanidae

See also 
Nelli (disambiguation)